Devin Boyce (born 8 September 1996) is an American soccer player who plays as a midfielder for Greenville Triumph in USL League One.

Career

Union Omaha
Just four days before Union Omaha's first USL League One match, Boyce was brought into the club. He made his debut for the club in their first ever competitive match against New England Revolution II.

Memphis 901
On January 20, 2022, Boyce signed with USL Championship side Memphis 901.

Greenville Triumph
Boyce returned to League One ahead of the 2023 season, signing with Greenville Triumph on January 26, 2023.

References

External links
Devin Boyce at Saint Louis University Athletics

1996 births
Living people
Soccer players from St. Louis
New Mexico Lobos men's soccer players
Saint Louis Billikens men's soccer players
Brazos Valley Cavalry FC players
Union Omaha players
Memphis 901 FC players
USL League One players
USL League Two players
American soccer players
Association football midfielders
Colorado Rapids U-23 players
Greenville Triumph SC players